Semiotus ligneus is a species of click beetle from Central and South America.

It closely resembles seed sheaths, which provides it with effective camouflage.

S. ligneus is the most frequently collected species in the genus Semiotus. Its closest relative is Semiotus serraticornis.

References

Elateridae
Beetles of North America
Beetles of South America
Beetles described in 1763
Taxa named by Carl Linnaeus